Climbing Italian Championships are annual national championships for competition climbing organised by the Italian Climbing Federation (Federazione Arrampicata Sportiva Italiana, FASI). The first championships was held in 1985 with only lead discipline. In 2000, speed and bouldering disciplines were introduced to the championships for the first time.

Lead 
In 1985 and 1986, the title of Italian champions was established based on the placings obtained by the athletes participating in Sportroccia. In 1987, the championships moved to the artificial walls of Torino Palavela in Turin.

From 1989 to 1993 instead of a single race the Italian Lead Championships took place in stages. In 1994 it returned to the single race and the championship was joined by a competition circuit Lead Italian Cup.

Speed

Bouldering

References

External links 
FASI official site
FASI database
1985-2005 results
www.federclimb.it: results

Climbing competitions